The 2019 AIBA World Boxing Championships were held in Yekaterinburg, Russia from 9 to 21 September 2019.

Weight classes have been adjusted to match those confirmed for the 2020 Olympic boxing tournament.

Medal summary

Medal table

Medal events

References

External links
Results Book
Official website
AIBA website

 
AIBA World Boxing Championships
AIBA World Boxing Championships
AIBA World Boxing Championships
International boxing competitions hosted by Russia
Sport in Yekaterinburg
AIBA World Boxing Championships